A.L.B Watches is a French luxury watch brand. The company was originally called Atelier Le Brézéguet, but changed its name in 2012.

Atelier Le Brézéguet 

Atelier Le Brézéguet refers to a locality in the Lot region of France. A.L.B workshop is based in the Toulouse area.

The founders are Vincent Candellé Tuheille & Simon-Pierre Delord, two engineers from ICAM.

Partly 3D printed watches 

A.L.B became known for its work on the field of 3D printing. The models A.L.B 000 and A.L.B 100 are among the first to integrate 3D printed dials.

References

Watch brands
Watch manufacturing companies of France
Luxury brands
French jewellery designers
French business families
French brands